Richard Louis Amaral (born April 1, 1962) is a former utility player in Major League Baseball who played with the Seattle Mariners (-), and Baltimore Orioles (-). He batted and threw right-handed. He has been a scout with the Orioles since the middle of the 2018 season.

Drafted by the Chicago Cubs in 1983, Amaral was claimed by the Chicago White Sox in the 1988 Rule 5 Draft. After becoming a free agent after the 1990 season, he signed with the Seattle Mariners and made his major league debut on May 27, 1991. Amaral played with the Mariners through 1998, and signed as a free agent with the Orioles on December 21, 1998. Released by the Orioles on July 28, 2000, he signed with the Atlanta Braves on August 25, 2000. Amaral played seven games for their Triple-A affiliate, the Richmond Braves and became a free agent after the season.

In his 10-year career, Amaral was a .276 hitter with 493 career hits. He was a college standout at UCLA earning nod as second baseman on the college All-American team. After being drafted in the second round by the Chicago Cubs, he spent his next nine years in Minor league baseball, and it appeared that he might be a career minor leaguer. After hitting .346 at Triple-A Calgary in 1991 (PCL batting champion) and .318 in 1992, Amaral got his chance to become a full-time Major League player at age 31 under new manager Lou Piniella in 1993. A versatile player, Amaral played at least forty games in the majors at every position except catcher and pitcher.

Amaral's son Beau played outfield for the UCLA team that went all the way to the 2010 College World Series Championship games. Beau was named to the All Tournament Team.  Beau was drafted by the Cincinnati Reds and in 2014 played with High Class-A affiliate in the California League, the Bakersfield Blaze.

References

External links

Rich Amaral at Baseball Almanac

Living people
1962 births
Baseball players from California
Major League Baseball infielders
Major League Baseball outfielders
Seattle Mariners players
Baltimore Orioles players
Kansas City Royals scouts
Richmond Braves players
Calgary Cannons players
Pittsfield Cubs players
Quad Cities Cubs players
Geneva Cubs players
Birmingham Barons players
Vancouver Canadians players
American expatriate baseball players in Canada
Sportspeople from Visalia, California
UCLA Bruins baseball players
Mat-Su Miners players